John B. Trevor (January 3, 1788 – September 29, 1860) was Pennsylvania State Treasurer from 1820 to 1821. He also served as Prothonotary of Fayette County, Pennsylvania from 1822 to 1824 and was the first cashier of the Connellsville Navigation Company, serving from 1816 to 1819.

He graduated from Jefferson College (now Washington & Jefferson College) in 1805.

References 

1788 births
1860 deaths
Washington & Jefferson College alumni
State treasurers of Pennsylvania
19th-century American politicians
People from Upton-upon-Severn
Politicians from Philadelphia